Šilutė (previously Šilokarčiama) is a city in the south of the Klaipėda County in western Lithuania. The city was part of the Klaipėda Region and ethnographic Lithuania Minor. Šilutė was the interwar capital of Šilutė County and is currently the capital of Šilutė District Municipality.

Name
Šilutė's origin dates to an inn (Krug, locally karčema) catering to travelers and their horses which was located halfway between Klaipėda and Tilsit (Tilžė). The German name of Heydekrug referred to a Krug (an archaic word for inn) in the Heide (heathland). The inn was known for being in the region where most people spoke the Memelland-Samogitian dialect Šilokarčema.

History

A famous fish market was opened in Šilutė almost 500 years ago, when Georg Tallat purchased the inn together with the land and fishing rights in 1511. Next to the inn a church of Werden (Verdainė) was built in 1550. It was a part of the Polish–Lithuanian Commonwealth, as a fief of Poland, held by the Teutonic Knights and secular Ducal Prussia.

From the 18th century, it was part of the Kingdom of Prussia. Heydekrug often sought town rights, but was opposed by Memel (Klaipėda) and Tilsit in 1721 and 1725. In 1722 it became a district center and in 1818 the capital of Landkreis Heydekrug, a predominantly Lithuanian-inhabited district in the late 19th century. From 1863, a Lithuanian newspaper was issued in the settlement. In the late 19th century, the settlement had a partly Lithuanian population of 2,042, which was mostly employed in agriculture, fishing and timber rafting. Several annual fairs were held there. Among the goods sold at the fairs were fish (e.g. to Warsaw and Saint Petersburg), pigs (to Berlin), vegetables, cattle, horses. The settlement was amalgamated with the villages of Werden (Verdainė), Szibben (Žibai), and Cynthionischken (Cintjoniškiai) in 1910, although it still did not receive city rights. Following World War I, the town became part of Lithuania when it acquired the Klaipėda Region in 1923.

The town was annexed by Nazi Germany in 1939 when it reacquired the Memel Territory. In 1941 the town finally received city rights. Under German occupation during World War II, it was the location of several German prisoner-of-war camps for Allied POWs of various nationalities, incl. the Stalag 331 C/I-C and Stalag I-D camps for regular soldiers, the Stalag Luft VI camp for airmen, and the Oflag 53 camp for officers.

Architecture

There remain many old buildings in Šilutė: an old post office (1905), a fire station (1911), a court building and prison (1848), a bridge across the Sziesze (Šyša) (1914), an estate of H. Scheu (1818), an old market square, a harbor, railway station and a bridge (1875), and the Vydūnas gymnasium.

Economy

The town, which is a regional center, has a well-developed infrastructure. There is an amateur theatre, a museum, three churches, a few hotels, and many cafés, restaurants, and bars. There are large industrial enterprises in Šilutė as well: Šilutės Rambynas (1842), producing butter and cheese, is one of the oldest factories in the area; Šilutės Baldai (1890); and Šilutės Durpės (1882) which exports approximately 50,000 m3 of peat. Newly founded enterprises are also prospering: Šilutės Girnos (combined fodder); Žibai; Grabupėliai (meat processing); and EKSA, a subsidiary of the alcohol producer Stumbras. To speed up capital investments, the region council has established land tax bonuses for investors.

Twin towns – sister cities

Šilutė is twinned with:

 Alanya, Turkey
 Cittaducale, Italy
 Emmerich am Rhein, Germany
 Gdańsk County, Poland
 Kołobrzeg, Poland
 Ljungby, Sweden
 Malbork, Poland
 Ostróda (rural gmina), Poland
 Pruszcz Gdański, Poland
 Saldus, Latvia
 Skadovsk, Ukraine
 Tarutyne, Ukraine
 Vellinge, Sweden

Notable people
 Hermann Sudermann (1857–1928), dramatist and novelist
 Vydūnas (Wilhelm Storost) (1868 in Jonaten – 1953) Prussian-Lithuanian teacher, poet, humanist and philosopher
 Katharina Szelinski-Singer (1918–2010), sculptor
 Cornell Borchers (1925–2014), actress
 Herbert Schernus (1927 in Wießen – 1994) German choral conductor 
 Hans-Georg Reimann (born 1941 in Starrischken) former East German race walker
 Doris Nefedov maiden name Treitz (1942–1969), German singer under the stage name "Alexandra"
 Raimondas Rumšas (born 1972), cyclist, 3rd place in 2002 Tour de France
 Mindaugas Timinskas (born 1974), basketball player
 Deividas Dulkys (born 1988), basketball player
 Evaldas Petrauskas (born 1992), boxer. 3rd place in 2012 Summer Olympics

References

External links

 Municipal website 

 
Cities in Klaipėda County
Cities in Lithuania

Municipalities administrative centres of Lithuania